Sandy Mayer and Frew McMillan were the defending champions, but did not participate this year.

Pavel Složil and Sherwood Stewart won the title, defeating Tracy Delatte and Chris Dunk 6–4, 6–7, 7–5 in the final.

Seeds

  Peter Fleming /  John McEnroe (quarterfinals, defaulted)
  Pavel Složil /  Sherwood Stewart (champions)
  Fritz Buehning /  Kim Warwick (first round, defaulted)
  Paul McNamee /  Tim Wilkison (quarterfinals)

Draw

Draw

References
Draw

1982 Grand Prix (tennis)
Donnay Indoor Championships